Edward Leier (3 November 1927 – 25 November 2022) was a Polish-born Canadian baseball player, track athlete, and ice hockey player. He played two seasons with the Chicago Black Hawks of the National Hockey League. He was named to the Manitoba Junior Hockey League Second All-Star Team in 1948. On 29 September 1948 he signed as a free agent to the Saskatoon Quakers of the Western Canada Senior Hockey League. Leier grew up in Winnipeg, Manitoba.

Leier played baseball for several years, and in 1950 was an all-star in the ManDak League. He was inducted into the Manitoba Baseball Hall of Fame in 2000, noted for his fielding, batting average, and baserunning. Leier was also Manitoba's provincial champion in 100 and 200 yard dashes. He was the grandfather of Canadian Olympic swimmer Rhiannon Leier. Leier died in November 2022, at the age of 95.

Career statistics

Regular season and playoffs

References

External links

1927 births
2022 deaths
Canadian ice hockey centres
Chicago Blackhawks players
Polish emigrants to Canada
Sportspeople from Rivne
Ice hockey people from Winnipeg
Winnipeg Black Hawks players
Winnipeg Rangers players
Canadian expatriate ice hockey players in the United States